Natalie Jane Appleton Howlett (born 14 May 1973) is a Canadian singer. She is a member of the British girl group All Saints and the duo Appleton with her younger sister Nicole Appleton.

Appleton joined All Saints in 1996, becoming the fourth and final member of the group, but five years later they split up amid group in-fighting. She went on to form a duo with her younger sister Nicole under the name Appleton. Since then, she has reunited to release three more albums with All Saints, in 2006, 2016 and 2018.

Career 
In 1983, Appleton moved to London and attended the Sylvia Young Theatre School. She had a brief cameo in an episode of Grange Hill in 1986.

1996–2001: All Saints 
Appleton's father met Melanie Blatt, with whom Nicole had attended the Sylvia Young Theatre School, and heard that Blatt was looking for new members for her girl group. Nicole asked whether her sister could join the group as well. In 1996 both sisters joined Blatt and Shaznay Lewis, forming All Saints. In 2000, Natalie and Nicole appeared in the poorly received film Honest. All Saints split acrimoniously in 2001 amid much foment and rumour. In their five-year career, the group scored a total of five number-one singles.

2002–2005: Appleton and television 
Natalie and Nicole formed the duo Appleton and launched their first single "Fantasy" in September 2002 which features Natalie doing a stage dive. Initially, it was to be Nicole doing the stage dive, but she backed out at the last minute, and thus Natalie took her place. The album Everything's Eventual was released in early 2003 and coincided with the documentary Appleton on Appleton which gave an inside look into the life of the sisters. In November 2004, Appleton was a contestant on the fourth series of I'm a Celebrity... Get Me Out of Here!. While on the show the public voted for her numerous times to take part in bushtucker trials, she was not very successful in completing the challenges and left after the public voted for her to do what would have been a record fifth bushtucker trial.

2006–2008: Return of All Saints 
All Saints reunited in early 2006 and released their third studio album titled Studio 1 on 13 November 2006. However, the group subsequently split again in 2009.

2014–present: Second All Saints reunion 
In 2014, All Saints reformed to support the Backstreet Boys for five dates across the UK and Ireland. On 27 January 2016, it was confirmed that All Saints were scheduled to release their fourth studio album Red Flag on 8 April 2016. The lead single from the album, "One Strike", preceded the album on 26 February 2016.

Early and personal life 
Nicole and Natalie have two older sisters, Lori and Lee. Natalie was born in Mississauga, Ontario, to Jewish parents Mary and Kenneth Appleton. While growing up she lived in Toronto, New York City, and London.

She attended high school in Ellenville, New York, and eventually left to sing at a Borscht Belt country club at age 15. In 1990, she moved back to Camden, England, where she met Carl Robinson (born c. 1967), a stripper with The Dreamboys whom she met when seeing them perform on a night out in London when she was 17. On 19 May 1992, their daughter Rachel Appleton (now Rachel Howlett) was born. She and Robinson moved to New York where they married in 1993, before Appleton returned to England after having the marriage annulled.

She had relationships with television presenter Jamie Theakston and actor Jonny Lee Miller during the late 1990s.

Appleton began dating Liam Howlett of the electronic band The Prodigy in 2000, after they met at V Festival. They married on 7 June 2002 in a ceremony in France. In addition to Appleton's daughter from her first marriage, the couple have a son, Ace Billy Howlett, born 2 March 2004. As of 2014, the family lived in the Hampstead area of London.

Discography

Filmography

References

External links 

 

1973 births
Living people
Actresses from Ontario
All Saints (group) members
Alumni of the Sylvia Young Theatre School
Canadian film actresses
Canadian people of English descent
Canadian television actresses
Canadian singer-songwriters
Jewish Canadian actresses
Jewish Canadian musicians
Jewish women singers
Musicians from Mississauga
Canadian expatriates in the United States
Canadian expatriates in England
Canadian women pop singers
21st-century Canadian women singers
Feminist musicians
I'm a Celebrity...Get Me Out of Here! (British TV series) participants